Sirah Baldé de Labé was a Guinean novelist and teacher. She studied to be a teacher in Rufisque, Senegal and became a pioneer for being the first woman to teach French in the former Fula Imamate of Futa Jallon during the French occupation. She is best known for her 1985 novel From One Futa Jalon to the Other.

References

External links
Further reading

Guinean women writers
Year of birth missing
Year of death missing
Guinean novelists
Women novelists
20th-century novelists
20th-century women writers
Guinean schoolteachers